Grootegast is a village and former municipality in the northeastern Netherlands. It is the sister city of Kingston, Tasmania. The municipality was merged into the municipality of Westerkwartier on 1 January 2019.

Geography 

The former municipality contained the population centres: Doezum, Enumatil, Faan, Grootegast, Kornhorn, Lutjegast, Niekerk, Oldekerk, Opende, Sebaldeburen. In some of these villages they still speak the West Frisian language.

The village of Grootegast 
Grootegast was the main village of the former municipality. The name of the village refers to a 'gast' or 'gaast', a higher, sandy ridge in an otherwise swampy area. Groot is Dutch for 'large'.

Grootegast is the birthplace of the theologian Cornelius Van Til.

Lutjegast 
Lutjegast is a village in the former municipality of Grootegast. In the Groningen dialect of Low German 'Lutje' means small or little.

Lutjegast was the birthplace of the explorer Abel Tasman.  Although the house of his birth no longer exists, he is memorialised with a monument, plaque and street name.

Until 1829 a mansion named Rikkerdaborg stood in Lutjegast.

References

External links
 

Westerkwartier (municipality)
Former municipalities of Groningen (province)
Populated places in Groningen (province)
Municipalities of the Netherlands disestablished in 2019